In linguistics, clitic doubling, or pronominal reduplication is a phenomenon by which clitic pronouns appear in verb phrases together with the full noun phrases that they refer to (as opposed to the cases where such pronouns and full noun phrases are in complementary distribution).

Clitic doubling is found in many languages, including Albanian, Aromanian, Macedonian, Bulgarian, Degema, Greek, Persian, Romanian, Somali, Italian, and Spanish.

The conditions on clitic doubling vary from language to language, generally depending on well-known properties of the objects along the animacy hierarchy (allowing, requiring, or forbidding clitic-doubling for different kinds of objects). In this regard, clitic doubling for objects can be viewed as a species of differential object marking.

Spanish 
Spanish is one well-known example of a clitic-doubling language, having clitic doubling for both direct and indirect objects. Because standard Spanish grammatical structure does not draw a clear distinction between an indirect object and a direct object referring to a person or another animate entity (see Spanish prepositions), it is common but not compulsory to use clitic doubling to clarify. Compare:

Conocí a Juan. "I met Juan." (Direct object: a Juan)
Di un regalo a Juan. "I gave a gift to Juan." (Direct object: un regalo; indirect object: a Juan)

In such constructions, the indirect object can be expressed both as a full noun phrase and as a clitic in order to note that the noun phrase beginning with a (to) should be understood as an indirect object. 

This usage is highly preferred for many verbs, but for some verbs it is not compulsory, and it would also be valid to say: "Siempre ofrezco café a mis invitados", without clitic doubling.

Similarly, the direct object may also be doubled, with both the direct object pronoun and the full noun phrase, but this is not as common as indirect clitic doubling and is usually influenced by definiteness, animacy, and specificity.

(Lo) vi a tu papá en la tienda. "I saw your dad at the store."
El otro día (la) conocí a su esposa. "The other day I met his wife."

One particular use is to clarify emphatic structures:

Ese regalo se lo di a él. "I gave him that gift."

Italian
In Italian, clitic doubling can be used for emphasis, is often viewed as a colloquial pleonasm, and is considered "incorrect" by many prescriptive grammarians.

Example: a me mi pare di sì ("I [personally, for what I am concerned] think so")

Iloko
In Iloko, a third person pronoun must co-occur with the full noun phrase to which it refers when 1) the noun phrase is the agent of a transitive verb and a pronoun is the patient, or when 2) the noun phrase is the possessor and a pronoun is the thing possessed. The appropriate fused personal pronoun is used and the number of its third person component must agree with the noun phrase.

Examples:
 Nakita ni Maria ni Juan.
 Maria saw Juan.
 
 Nakitana ni Juan.
 She saw Juan.
 
 BUT...
 Nakitanaka ni Maria.
 Maria saw you.
 NOT *Nakitaka ni Maria.

NOT: *Nakitaak ni Maria.

NOT: *Nakitaak da Maria ken ni Juan.

NOT: *Anakka dagiti Rizal.

Lombard 
In Lombard, clitics are widely used with both nouns and pronouns.

Venetian 
In Venetian, clitics usually double the second singular person subject and third singular and plural subject.

The above, if literally translated into English, would be redundant:

Interrogative subjects clitics double also other subjects. They attach to the verb:

Accusative clitics double first and second singular/plural direct object

In some varieties of the language, also dative clitics may double and indirect object, even of third person:

Macedonian and Bulgarian
In the standard Macedonian language, clitic doubling is obligatory with definite direct and indirect objects, which contrasts with standard Bulgarian where clitic doubling is optional. Non-standard dialects of Macedonian and Bulgarian have differing rules regarding clitic doubling.

Arabic 
Clitic doubling is found in Levantine dialects of Arabic, such as Lebanese Arabic:

 قلتلها لإمي (iltilla la-immi) "I told my mother". Literally: I-said-to-her to-my-mother.
 The indirect-object suffix is appended to the verb and the noun additionally takes a clitic.
 كتابو لجوزي (ktābu la-jawzi) "my husband's book". Literally: his-book of-my-husband.
 The possessive suffix is appended to the possessed noun and the possessor is additionally indicated with a clitic.

Similar patterns are found in Maltese, where, however, they might also be due to Romance influence.

Degema 
Clitic doubling occurs in Degema, as it does in Romance and Slavic languages. However, clitic doubling in Degema is not associated with the presence of a preposition as in Romance languages like Spanish nor is it associated with topicality or specificity as in Slavic languages like Bulgarian. Rather, what makes clitic doubling in Degema possible are syntactic (movement and anaphoricity) and discourse (emphasis and/or familiarity) factors (Kari 2003) Consider (1) below:

In (1) the subject noun phrase (NP) 'Eni' is doubled by the clitic 'mo='. The clitic agrees in person, number and case with the doubled subject NP.

Example (2) shows that specific and non-specific subjects in Degema can be doubled by a clitic:

Example (3) shows that both topicalized and non-topicalized NPs in Degema can be doubled by a clitic:

In Degema, the preposition does not feature in clitic doubling constructions in particular and in cliticization in general. Although there are object NPs such as indirect object NPs that can cooccur with a preposition, there are no corresponding object clitics to double them, unlike subject NPs.

Kari (2003: 135f) adds that "syntactic factors are stronger than discourse factors in the licensing of clitic doubling in Degema.  Discourse factors only ensure the expression or suppression of the doubled NP after syntactic operations have taken place".

See also
Resumptive pronoun

Notes

References
  Friedman, V. (1994) "Variation and Grammaticalization in the Development of Balkanisms" in CLS 30 Papers from the 30th Regional Meeting of the Chicago Linguistic Society, Volume 2. (Chicago: Chicago Linguistic Society)
  Kari, Ethelbert Emmanuel. 2003. Clitics in Degema: A meeting point of phonology, morphology, and syntax. Tokyo: Research Institute for Languages and Cultures of Asia and Africa (ILCAA). .

CL:clitic

Grammar
Reduplication